Touch rugby at the 2015 Pacific Games was held on 3–10 July 2015 at Port Moresby in Papua New Guinea. Papua New Guinea defeated Samoa in the finals of both the men's and women's tournament by 8–7 and 6–2, respectively to claim two of the three gold medals for touch rugby. Samoa turned the tables to claim the gold medal in the mixed tournament, defeating Papua New Guinea by 9–7 in the final. The Cook Islands won all three bronze medals.

Medal summary

Medal table

Results

See also
 Touch rugby at the Pacific Games

References

 
2015 Pacific Games
2015